is a maze arcade game in the Pac-Man series which was released for PlayStation 4, Windows, and Xbox One on September 15, 2016; an updated version featuring an exclusive 2-player co-op mode, Pac-Man Championship Edition 2 Plus, was released for Nintendo Switch on February 22, 2018.
It was developed and published by Bandai Namco Entertainment, and is a direct sequel to Pac-Man Championship Edition, making it an indirect follow-up of Pac-Man Championship Edition DX+.

Gameplay

Pac-Man Championship Edition 2 builds upon the gameplay introduced in Championship Edition and Championship Edition DX+, which added faster gameplay to the traditional Pac-Man formula. Taking control of Pac-Man, players go through various mazes collecting pellets while avoiding the roaming ghosts. Gathering enough pellets will either reveal a bonus item that sends Pac-Man to the next maze or a Power Pellet that can be used to eat ghosts. Unlike previous iterations of Pac-Man, in which touching ghosts would instantly kill Pac-Man, ghosts can now be bumped into up to three times in succession before they enter an Angry state, during which touching them will cause Pac-Man to lose a life. Similar to Championship DX, passing by sleeping ghosts will add them to a trail behind the other ghosts, allowing for large point bonuses when eaten. Players can also use jump pads to jump over parts of a maze and bombs to instantly return to the start of a maze. The game features two main modes: Score Attack, in which players must try and rack up a high score within a time limit, and Adventure, which requires players to clear several objectives, including fighting giant bosses. The Nintendo Switch 'Plus' version also features a co-op mode known as "Pac-Man Championship Edition 2 Plus 2P". Player 1 will play as a yellow Pac-Man, while Player 2 plays as a turquoise Pac-Man, while still following the same rules, Players 1 and 2 need to eat fruit together to get to the next maze. When a player gets caught by a ghost, you will have a few seconds to save said player from losing a life. When there are only a few minutes left, a giant ghost will break the stage, putting both players in a bigger maze where you can jump around. While eating Power Pellets in this scenario, you need to bump the giant ghost until they explode, letting you eat the fruit to get to the stage.

Reception

Pac-Man Championship Edition 2 received "generally favorable" reviews from critics according to Metacritic.

Re-releases

Pac-Man Championship Edition 2 + Arcade Game Series
A retail disc for PlayStation 4 and Xbox One containing Pac-Man Championship Edition 2 compiled with three games from the Arcade Game Series (Pac-Man, Galaga, and Dig Dug) was released for PlayStation 4 and Xbox One on November 1, 2016 in North America.

Namco Museum Arcade Pac

Namco Museum Arcade Pac is a retail video game compilation for Nintendo Switch that includes Pac-Man Championship Edition 2 Plus along with select games included in Namco Museum for Nintendo Switch.

Notes

References

External links

2016 video games
Maze games
Pac-Man
PlayStation 4 games
Video games developed in Japan
Windows games
Xbox One games
Nintendo Switch games